The 1898 Ohio Green and White football team was an American football team that represented Ohio University as an independent during the 1898 college football season. Led by Peter McLaren in his first and only season as head coach, the team compiled a record of 1–2–1.

Schedule

References

Ohio
Ohio Bobcats football seasons
Ohio Green and White football